Frank Charles Bolick (born June 28, 1966) is a former Major League Baseball player from Ashland, Pennsylvania. He was an infielder for the Montreal Expos and Anaheim Angels. He also played four seasons in Japan with the Chiba Lotte Marines. He threw right-handed, and was a switch hitter.

Early career
Bolick played high school baseball at Mount Carmel Area and was drafted out of high school by the Montreal Expos in 1985, but did not sign, instead choosing to play college baseball at Georgia Tech. He was drafted again by the Milwaukee Brewers in 1987, and signed with them on June 12 of that year.

Professional career

North America
He played in 95 games that year, hitting 4 home runs and 24 RBIs with a .211 batting average. He played 21 games before being released at the end of the season.

Japan
The Marines hoped he would emerge as the new cleanup hitter that the team badly needed, but he did not hit well in pre-season games, and began the season in the minors. However, he hit a home run in his first at-bat in April, and emerged as the team's best power hitter by the end of his first season. The Marines compiled a 22-2-1 record in games where Bolick hit a home run, and a cult belief emerged among Marines fans that the team would never lose as long as Bolick hit a home run. However, he was also one at-bat away from tying the league record for consecutive at-bats without a hit, going 0 for 51 at the end of the season. He finished the season with 26 home runs and 61 RBIs.

Bolick's production increased in his second season in Japan, where he hit 29 home runs with 102 RBIs in 125 games. He also drew 107 walks; the Japanese single-season record, and won the Best Nine Award for designated hitter. He played an epic game on July 9, 2001, against the Fukuoka Daiei Hawks; the Marines were 3 runs behind in the 10th inning, and Bolick finished the game with a walk-off grand slam off closer Rodney Pedraza.

He was demoted to the minors after injuring his left knee, and was released in August. He left Japan on September 28, and a large number of Marines fans showed up at Narita International Airport to bid him farewell.

External links

1966 births
Living people
American expatriate baseball players in Canada
American expatriate baseball players in Japan
American expatriate baseball players in Mexico
Anaheim Angels players
Calgary Cannons players
Chiba Lotte Marines players
Colorado Springs Sky Sox players
Baseball players from Pennsylvania
Beloit Brewers players
Buffalo Bisons (minor league) players
Georgia Tech Yellow Jackets baseball players
Jacksonville Suns players
Lubbock Crickets players
Major League Baseball infielders
Midland Angels players
Montreal Expos players
New Haven Ravens players
Nippon Professional Baseball designated hitters
Ottawa Lynx players
People from Ashland, Pennsylvania
San Bernardino Spirit players
Stockton Ports players
Vancouver Canadians players
Guerreros de Oaxaca players